The Staines & West Drayton Railway (S&WDR) is a former railway on the western edge of London, England. It opened from West Drayton on the Great Western Main Line to Colnbrook in 1884 and reached Staines the next year.

Passengers
By 1961 it had five intermediate stations but local passenger traffic failed to develop. The area is sparsely populated, being in the flood plain of the river Colne and with the large Staines and Wraysbury reservoirs on both sides of the line. The line was closed to passengers on 29 March 1965 as a consequence of the Beeching cuts.

Connections
The promoters had wanted a connection at Staines to the London and South Western Railway but that company would not allow the Great Western Railway access and the S&WDR terminated at a separate station, converted from a Georgian house. A connection of sorts between the two lines developed through the sidings and turntables of the Staines Linoleum Company's factory but the first purpose-built link was a curve laid in 1940 from Staines Moor Junction some three chains south of Yeoveney Halt to an east-facing connection on the Southern Railway east-bound route to give a diversionary route should central London north–south routes be cut by bombing.

The line today

Northern section
Freight trains still run from West Drayton serving the aviation fuel terminal for Heathrow Airport at Colnbrook and aggregates depots at Thorney and Colnbrook.

Southern section
The section south of Colnbrook to the bridge over the Southern Railway's line from Staines to Windsor was abandoned and track lifted in 1981 as part of the route was required for the construction of the M25 motorway. The formation has been built over in several places but a section at Staines Moor is used as a footpath. A fuel oil terminal was built in 1964 on the site of the former goods yard at Staines West. When the line south of Colnbrook closed in 1981, a new connecting line was built for the terminal to the Staines to Windsor & Eton Line and this was used until closure in 1991.

Proposed changes
The proposed Airtrack-Lite rail link from Heathrow Airport through Staines would entail laying track near the former southern part of the S&WDR route.

Phase 2 of the proposed Windsor Link Railway would link the existing northern section to a new interchange station at Poyle then onward to both Slough and Staines via an extended Staines to Windsor Line.

References

External links 
 London's Abandoned Stations

Closed railway lines in London
Railway lines opened in 1885
Rail transport in Surrey
Transport in the London Borough of Hillingdon
Standard gauge railways in England